Wheel of Fate is a 1953 British drama film directed by Francis Searle and starring Patric Doonan, Sandra Dorne and Bryan Forbes. The screenplay concerns a man who turns to crime to raise the money he needs to spend time with a woman with whom he falls in love. It was produced as a second feature and shot at Riverside Studios in London. The film's sets were designed by the art director Wilfred Arnold. It was released by Rank's General Film Distributors.

Plot
Two brothers working in their father's repair garage: quiet sensible Johnny (Patric Doonan) and the younger and wilder Ted (Bryan Forbes) fall out when Ted brings home Lucky (Sandra Dorne), a beautiful dance hall singer. The brothers feud when she unexpectedly falls for Johnny, and crime and mayhem ensue.

Cast
 Patric Doonan as Johnny Burrows 
 Sandra Dorne as Lucky Price 
 Bryan Forbes as Ted Reid 
 John Horsley as Detective Sergeant Simpson 
 Johnnie Schofield as Len Bright 
 Martin Benson as Riscoe 
 Cyril Smith as Perce 
 Bernard Rebel   
 Fred Griffiths    
 Michael McCarthy   
 Bartlett Mullins   
 Frederick Treves

References

Bibliography
 Chibnall, Steve & McFarlane, Brian. The British 'B' Film. Palgrave MacMillan, 2009.

External links
 

1953 films
1953 drama films
Films directed by Francis Searle
British drama films
British black-and-white films
Films shot at Riverside Studios
1950s English-language films
1950s British films